Broken Fingers/Live in Aberdeen is a live album featuring the band Stiff Little Fingers, released in 1979 (see 1979 in music), and later released as a picture disc in 1996 (see 1996 in music).

Track listing
"Alternative Ulster [live]" (Burns, Ogilvie) – 3:19
"Barbed Wire Love" (Stiff Little Fingers, Ogilvie)
"Johnny Was" (Robert Marley)
"Suspect Device Takes 1&2" (Ogilvie, Stiff Little Fingers) – 2:30
"Nobody's Hero" (Stiff Little Fingers)
"No More of That" (Stiff Little Fingers)
"Gotta Gettaway" (Burns, Ogilvie)
"Rough Trade" (Stiff Little Fingers)
"Breakout" (Stiff Little Fingers)
"Straw Dogs" (Burns, Ogilvie)
"Wasted Life" (Burns) – 2:58

1979 live albums
Stiff Little Fingers live albums